New York Lawyers for the Public Interest, Inc. ("New York Lawyers" or "NYLPI" [nil-pee]) is a non-profit civil rights law firm located in New York City, specializing in the areas of disability rights, access to health care and environmental justice.

NYLPI was founded in 1976 by eleven attorneys and nine law firms to meet the legal needs of underserved, underrepresented New Yorkers and their communities. This arrangement ultimately evolved into NYLPI's pro bono clearinghouse, which now matches volunteer lawyers from prestigious law firms and corporate legal departments with community groups and nonprofit organizations in need of legal services.

NYLPI also has a number of in-house staff attorneys, social workers and community organizers working in the organization's three areas of specialization.  NYLPI's Disability Justice Program "protects and promotes the civil rights of people with disabilities," its  Environmental Justice Program "provides organizing and legal assistance to low-income neighborhoods and communities of color that bear an unfair burden of environmental threats," and its Health Justice Program "works to ensure access to quality health care for people in medically underserved communities or facing barriers due to limited English proficiency, racial and ethnic discrimination, and disability."

NYLPI was once associated with the National Campaign to Restore Civil Rights (NCRCR), "a national collaboration of lawyers, academics, students, community activists, and concerned individuals who have joined together in response to recent federal court decisions that are eroding civil rights protections," but is no longer connected to it.

Mission
NYLPI's mission is to advance equality and civil rights, with a focus on health justice, disability justice, and environmental justice, through the power of community lawyering and partnerships with the private bar.

History
New York Lawyers for the Public Interest originated in proposals submitted to the Association of the Bar of the City of New York in 1973 by its Young Lawyers Committee and the Council of New York Law Associates. Both addressed the need for legal services to organizations serving the public interest.  A Subcommittee on Legal Services Programs, appointed by Orville Schell, Jr., President of the Association, and chaired by David Sive, was charged with making appropriate recommendations, and resulting issues were resolved under the Presidency of Cyrus R. Vance in 1975. Vance served as the organization's first chairman and was succeeded by Schell in 1977, when Vance became Secretary of State.

Founders

Founding board members:
Cyrus R. Vance, chairman;
Carol Bellamy
Robert Carswell
Adrian W. DeWind
R. Scott Greathead
Hervey M. Johnson
Francis T. P. Plimpton
Frederick A. O. Schwarz, Jr.
Deborah L. Seidel
David Sive
Daniel L. Kurtz, executive director

Founding law firms:
Chadbourne & Parke
Cravath, Swaine & Moore
Debevoise & Plimpton
Shearman & Sterling
Simpson Thacher & Bartlett
Skadden, Arps, Slate, Meagher & Flom
Willkie Farr & Gallagher
Winer, Neuberger & Sive
Winthrop, Stimson, Putnam & Roberts

See also

Activism
Civil rights
Disability rights
Environmentalism
Health care
The New York Foundation
Pro bono
Public Interest Law Clearing House, an Australian organization modeled on NYLPI
Weiquan movement

References
Notes

Further reading

External links
New York Lawyers for the Public Interest
National Campaign to Restore Civil Rights

Civil rights organizations in the United States
Disability rights organizations
Civil liberties advocacy groups in the United States
Law firms based in New York City
Law firms established in 1976
Healthcare reform advocacy groups in the United States
Disability law advocacy groups in the United States
1976 establishments in New York City